Edward D. E. van Weenen (1847 – 28 July 1925) was an Australian philatelist who signed the Roll of Distinguished Philatelists in 1925.

References

Signatories to the Roll of Distinguished Philatelists
1847 births
1925 deaths
Australian philatelists